Peter A. Demeter was a  German designer at the Weber Typefoundry.

Fonts Designed 
 Demeter (1922, Schriftguss Type Foundry, later Typoart) This is one of a few German faces BB&S in Chicago received in exchange for rights to the Cooper types.
 Demeter Schraffiert (1922, Schriftguss Type Foundry
 Dresden, decorative face, for Schriftgus A.G. Dresden, cut by Barnhart Brothers & Spindler in 1925, 12-30pt
 Fournier (1922, probably Schriftguss Type Foundry, later Typoart)
 Holländisch (1922 - 1926, Weber Typefoundry), shaded roman capitals in regular, bold, and extended.
 Pearl Fournier (1922, probably Schriftguss Type Foundry).  In Germany this is known as Geperlte Fournier and called Dresden when it was later published by BB&S in Chicago.

References

1870s births
1947 deaths
German graphic designers
German typographers and type designers